Fulton 58 School District (FPS) is a school district headquartered in Fulton, Missouri.

 the district had about 2,200 students.

Schools
 Fulton High School
 Fulton Middle School
 Bartley Elementary School
 Bush Elementary School
 McIntire Elementary School
 Fulton Early Childhood Center

References

External links
 

School districts in Missouri